Magdalena Abakanowicz University of the Arts Poznan Poznań (in Polish: Uniwersytet Artystyczny im. Magdaleny Abakanowicz w Poznaniu) is one of the major fine-art academies in Poland. It was founded in 1919 as the State School of Decorative Arts (Pol. Państwowa Szkoła Sztuki Zdobniczej).

History

1919–1938: Szkoła Zdobnicza and Państwowa Szkoła Sztuk Zdobniczych i Przemysłu Artystycznego in Poznań 
Following many efforts raised during the partitions of Poland, on November 1, 1919, the State School of Decorative Arts (Państwowa Szkoła Sztuk Zdobnicznych) was opened in Poznań. In 1921, the school was put under state government and started operating under the name of the State School of Decorative Arts and the Art Industry. During the years 1919–1925 the educational program implemented related primarily to crafts, art industry and painting. A new Department of Interior Design was opened in the academic year 1927/28. By 1927 there were six faculties within the School: Department of Decorative Painting and Design, Department of Graphics and Bookbinding, Department of Ceramics, Faculty of Metal Sculpture, Bronzing and Jewellery, Department of Textiles and the Department of Interior Design. In 1929, the staff and students of the Poznań took part in the Universal National Exhibition (Pol. Powszechna Wystawa Krajowa), presenting their works in the Art Department, as well as in other exhibition spaces of the UNE.

1938–1939: Państwowy Instytut Sztuk Plastycznych in Poznań 
On June 1, 1937, the State School of Decorative Arts and the Art Industry was renamed the State Institute of Fine Arts. The institute's education lasted five years and was divided into one-year courses at the General Department and special departments - the academic year in each department began on September 10 and ended on June 20. In these years, the Institute employed a total of 40 employees, 23 teachers and instructors, 12 supplementary teachers and 4 members of administrative staff, while the students were divided into ordinary and extraordinary, depending on their previous education. As a part of the institute's activities, a public drawing room was opened with a drawing course. The main task of the institute was "artistic and technical preparation of employees of the artistic industry and handicrafts for independent creative work in various branches of the field".

1946–1996: Państwowa Wyższa Szkoła Sztuk Plastycznych 
After World War II, the institute was transformed into the State Higher School of Fine Arts with the departments of Painting and Graphics as well as Interior Art and Sculpture. In the 1950s, because of the restrictions of the authorities, painting, graphics and weaving were abolished and replaced with furniture making and interior design, which became the main disciplines taught at School. After the Khrushchev Thaw, the school moved to the building of Sądownictwo Krajowe, which belongs to the University of Arts complex to these days. A number of art galleries closely related to the university were opened and were active throughout the 1980s and 1990s.

1996 onwards 
In 1996, the School obtained the status of the Academy of Fine Arts, and in 2010 the status of the University of Arts.

In 2013 the revitalization of the main building was completed, restoring the previous facade colour and architectural details, such as ornaments and sculptures.

In 2016, a new didactic building was opened, housing working spaces for students, television and film studios, a paintshop, a printing house and an exhibition space in the lobby. The lobby was equipped with the so-called acoustic shower.

Since October 2016, five university galleries have opened: Duża Scena UAP, Mała Scena UAP, Galeria CURATORS 'Lab, Galeria Design and Galeria R20. The exhibitions organised in the university galleries primarily show the works of students, graduates and staff of the university and are a place for various workshops for adults and children.

Faculties

 Department of Animation and Intermedia
 Department of Architecture and Design
 Department of Interior Design and Scenography
 Department of Graphic Arts and Visual Communication
 Department of Painting and Drawing
 Department of Sculpture 
 Department of Photography
 Department of Interior and Stage Design

Artists associated with the University

 Magdalena Abakanowicz
 Agnieszka Balewska
 Jan Berdyszak
 Kiejstut Bereźnicki
 
 
 
 
 Józef Gosławski
  
 Joanna Hoffmann-Dietrich
 Rafał Jakubowicz
 
 
  
  
 Józef Kopczyński 
 Jarosław Kozłowski
 Pawel Kuczynski
 Grzegorz Marszałek
 Tomasz Matusewicz
 Krzysztof Olszewski
 Teresa Pągowska
 Urszula Plewka-Schmidt
 Zbigniew Rogalski
 Marcin Rożek
 Jerzy Sobociński
 Monika Sosnowska
 Waldemar Świerzy
 Piotr Szyhalski
 Stanisław Teisseyre
 Olgierd Truszyński
 Stefan Wojnecki
 Bazyli Wojtowicz

References

External links
 Official website of the University

Art schools in Poland
University of Fine Arts in Poznań
Educational institutions established in 1919
1919 establishments in Poland